Government Medical College & ESI Hospital, Coimbatore,  is a Government co-educational Medical College located at Varadharajapuram, Singanallur, Coimbatore.
It was established in 2016 under the aegis of the ESI Corporation, a central autonomous body under Ministry of Labour and Employment, Government of India. The college is attached to a 510-bedded Multi-Speciality Hospital which was built in 2016. During the Covid pandemic, the hospital was the first referral centre for Coimbatore and neighboring districts and was the chief covid treatment centre that treated patients following which the number of beds were increased to 1000. It is also the only govt college in Tamil Nadu where all the wings of AYUSH are functional.

The college has an intake of 100 students per year via neet counselling. 85 seats are under State quota and 15 seats under the All India quota. As of 2021, all five batches are filled and the college is fast emerging as one of the best centres for medical education in the region. In 2022, 5 Postgraduate seats have also been started for Emergency Medicine in this college.

Student Life on Campus

The college has a very active student life involving culturals and academic activities.

Batches

The first five Batches are named as such:

2016 - Excalibranz

2017 - Salvarianz

2018 - Xanthronz

2019 - Zenforianz

2020 - Valerianz

Cultural Activities and Fests

Anatomy Model Making Competition- 3D Model Making

Anatomy Art Competition

Pongal Celebration 2016- Pattimandram and Tug of war were the main events to headline the function.

Ephedra-19 - First edition of Intracollege culturals

Aadhava Vidiyal'21 - Pongal Celebration ( Native Parai Drummers were the special attraction that made headlines all over Coimbatore )

EsiOnam - Onam Celebration

Aurora'21 - Intracollege Online Cultural Event

Ephedra 2.0 '22 - Intracollege Culturals

Academic Activities

The major academic activities include quizzing tournaments organised by the quiz clubs of the college to promote active learning and bonding via competitive quizzing on medical subjects. Seminars are also presented by students time to time to inculcate CME training.

Renal Quiz- Intracollege Renal Quiz

Enteroquiz'18 - Intracollege Gastroenterology Quiz

Corpuscles'19 -Intracollege Hematology Quiz

Rhythm'21 - Intracollege Online Cardiology Quiz

Student Seminar Competitions

Research activities - Individual and ICMR Medical Student Research activity

Sports

The college has an active sports environment that includes badminton, volleyball, football and cricket teams that have played and won multiple intercollege competitions.

Ephedra Sports Fest- the sports fest was held in tandem with the Ephedra culturals.

The sports facilities include a cricket ground, a football ground and Volleyball and Badminton Courts.

Campus Facilities

The entire campus has been divided into two parts. The first segment consists of the college block, auditorium, covid block, Girls hostel buildings(2 in number), cricket ground, football ground, mortuary,boys hostel and boys intern hostel. The second segment comprises the OPD, IPD,24×7 Buildings, ESI dispensary, girls intern hostel and staff quarters. 

As of 2022, autopsies are being conducted at the mortuary and includes minimum 4 or 5 autopsies a day.

The EMD is functional and caters only to ESI patients for the time being and also general public who are RTA victims for 48hrs under the NK-48 scheme. 

POSTGRADUATE COURSE

As of 2022, 5 seats for MD in Emergency Medicine have been sanctioned and postgraduates have been enrolled under NEET PG.The candidates divide their time between EMD and other postings for exposure in all departments.

Departments
 Anatomy
 Physiology
 Biochemistry
 Blood Bank & Transfusion Medicine
 Pathology
 Community Medicine
 General Medicine
 General Surgery
 Obstetrics and Gynaecology
 Paediatrics
 Dermatology
 Radio-diagnosis
 Forensic Science
 ENT
 Ophthalmology
 TB and Respiratory science
 Dental Surgery
 Psychiatry

References

Medical colleges in Tamil Nadu
Employees' State Insurance